Randal Kolo Muani (born 5 December 1998) is a French professional footballer who plays as a forward for Bundesliga club Eintracht Frankfurt and the France national team.

Early life
Randal Kolo Muani was born on 5 December 1998 in Bondy, Seine-Saint-Denis. He is of Congolese descent.

Club career

Nantes
At the start of his career, Kolo Muani played for several Parisian teams, including Villepinte, Trembley and US Torcy. During the same period, he also trained with Italian teams Vicenza and Cremonese, before joining Nantes' youth academy in 2015. Kolo Muani received his first call-up to the Nantes first team on 12 February 2017 for a match against Marseille and on 4 June 2018, he signed his first professional contract with his childhood club, Nantes. He made his professional debut in a 3–0 Ligue 1 loss to Saint-Étienne on 30 November 2018. On 21 January 2019 he made his first start in a 1–0 loss to Angers.

In August 2019, Kolo Muani joined Boulogne on a season-long loan deal. On 30 August, he made his first appearance with the club in a Championnat National match against Avranches, and he scored his first goal for the club on 21 February 2020. At Boulogne, he demonstrated his talents and contributed 3 goals and 5 assists, helping the club reach third place in the standings in the tournament, which ended prematurely due to the COVID-19 pandemic.

Kolo Muani returned to Nantes for the 2020–21 season and scored his first goal for Les Canaris in a 3–1 win against Brest. He scored 9 goals and provided as many assists in 37 appearances, but the club had a challenging season and finished in seventeenth place. As a result, they landed in the in the Ligue 1 relegation/promotion play-offs against Toulouse, winners of the Ligue 2 play-offs. During the play-offs, Kolo Muani scored one goal in two matches, helping Nantes avoid relegation.. During the following season, Kolo Muani had another outstanding performance, scoring 12 goals and providing 5 assists in 37 appearances. He also won his first trophy with the club, the 2021–22 Coupe de France.

Eintracht Frankfurt
On 4 March 2022, Bundesliga club Eintracht Frankfurt signed Kolo Muani on a pre-contract agreement ahead of the expiration of his Nantes contract. He signed a five-year deal with the club. On 26 October 2022, he scored his first UEFA Champions League goal in a 2–1 win over Marseille, and on 1 November, he scored the winning goal in a 2–1 away victory over Sporting CP, securing his club's qualification to the knockout phase for the first time in the Champions League era.

On 7 February 2023, Kolo Muani scored his first double in the DFB-Pokal in a 4–2 home victory over Darmstadt. Eleven days later, he scored his 10th goal in the Bundesliga against Werder Bremen.

International career
Kolo Muani was a youth international for France. He has previously played matches for his country's under-21 national team.

On 15 September 2022, Kolo Muani received his first call-up to the France national team for two UEFA Nations League matches.  On 16 November 2022, he replaced Christopher Nkunku in France's FIFA World Cup squad after the latter was forced to withdraw due to injury. On 14 December, Kolo Muani scored his first goal for France, in the semi-final match against Morocco, slotting in a deflected shot from Kylian Mbappé. He also became the third fastest player to score a goal as a substitute in the World Cup, after 44 seconds, only behind Richard Morales and Ebbe Sand. In the final against Argentina, he won a penalty which was converted into a goal by Kylian Mbappé, then scored in the penalty shootout which ended in a 4–2 defeat. During the match, past the 120th minute and into the final stoppage time before penalties, Kolo Muani had an opportunity to score the go-ahead goal and potentially win the World Cup for France, but it was saved by Emiliano Martínez in what has been described as the "new "Save of the Century"". Kolo Muani recalls the moment by saying "I could have lobbed him, or find Kylian Mbappe [to the left]. But in the moment, I didn't see him. It's only when you watch back that you discover the other options. It's too late. It still sticks in my throat and it'll be there for life."

Player profile

Style of play 
Kolo Muani's playing style has drawn comparisons to the legendary French striker Thierry Henry. Like Henry, Kolo Muani began his career as a wide player known for his pace and trickery, but eventually transitioned into a center-forward position. Both players have a similar height of around 6'2" and possess rangy physiques. Kolo Muani's languid dribbling style and impressive speed are also reminiscent of Henry's style of play, particularly during his younger days. He has a remarkable strength on the ball and a playful approach to the game that can leave defenders trailing behind him.

France national team coach, Didier Deschamps, acknowledged Kolo Muani's many qualities, describing him as a player who has a significant presence, runs in behind from deep, and has a good finishing ability.

Frankfurt's head coach, Oliver Glasner, praised Kolo Muani's speed, tackling, dribbling, and finishing skills, noting that he is an asset to the team.

Markus Krösche, Eintracht Frankfurt's board member for sport, expressed his excitement for Kolo Muani's potential, stating that his speed, robustness, finishing skills, and tactical versatility are qualities that the team needs. He further noted that Kolo Muani's potential had attracted the interest of many clubs, and the team is delighted that he has chosen to take his next steps with them.

Career statistics

Club

International

France score listed first, score column indicates score after each Kolo Muani goal

Honours
Nantes
Coupe de France: 2021–22

France
FIFA World Cup runner-up: 2022

References

External links

Profile at the Eintracht Frankfurt website

1998 births
Living people
Sportspeople from Bondy
Footballers from Seine-Saint-Denis
French footballers
Association football forwards
US Torcy players
FC Nantes players
US Boulogne players
Eintracht Frankfurt players
Ligue 1 players
Championnat National players
Championnat National 2 players
Championnat National 3 players
France under-21 international footballers
Olympic footballers of France
France international footballers
Footballers at the 2020 Summer Olympics
2022 FIFA World Cup players
French expatriate footballers
Expatriate footballers in Germany
French expatriate sportspeople in Germany
Black French sportspeople
French sportspeople of Democratic Republic of the Congo descent